The House at 36 Columbia Drive is a historic home in Tampa, Florida at 36 Columbia Drive on Davis Islands. It was built by Herbert Draper, a successful realtor during the Florida land boom, in 1926, and is an L-shaped hacienda with a three-story open campanile and transom windows. On August 3, 1989, it was added to the U.S. National Register of Historic Places.

References and external links
 Hillsborough County listings at National Register of Historic Places

Gallery

References

Houses in Tampa, Florida
History of Tampa, Florida
Houses on the National Register of Historic Places in Hillsborough County, Florida
Mediterranean Revival architecture of Davis Islands, Tampa, Florida
1925 establishments in Florida